Thomas Roy (born November 30, 1944) is an American film, television and voice actor.

Early life
Roy was born in the suburbs surrounding Philadelphia and raised in Hatboro, Montgomery County, Pennsylvania.

Roy moved to New York City to pursue an acting career.  He stated in a 2008 interview with the Lancaster Intelligencer Journal that he, "always had to worry about the last job being my last job ever...All actors worry about that."

Career

Roy played the street preacher in 12 Monkeys.  Roy's character in the film seems to recognize the movie's main character, James Cole, a time traveler portrayed by Bruce Willis.

Roy has also done voice over and live radio acting.

"I have a safety net now...And what's great is that just before getting the callback for 'Romans,' I was going to go into semi retirement — but then I was asked to audition. I'm still marketable as an actor.," said Roy in the same 2008 interview.

Roy was in the television movie, Home, starring Marcia Gay Harden. Roy's theater roles include the play Jacob's Choice, portraying an Amish grandfather, Isaac Fisher, at the F/X Theatre in Bird-in-Hand, Pennsylvania.

Roy was in the 2009 dark comedy film The Answer Man.  He played an alcoholic father who welcomes back his son, played by Taylor Pucci, who returns home from drug rehab. Roy commented on his role that "My character is a drunk, but likable. The tone is light and altruistic. I just loved the script."

In 2009 Roy played Old Man Harrison in Night Catches Us, written and directed by Tanya Hamilton.

Special days

Roy and his wife, Ruth Deck Roy, have created approximately 80 "special days", which are listed in Chase's Calendar of Events.

List of days

 January 2 -  Happy Mew Year For Cats Day
 January 3 -  Memento Mori
 January 4 -  Dimpled Chad Day
 January 8 -  Show & Tell Day at Work
 January 17 -  Judgement Day
 January 22 -  Answer Your Cat’s Question Day
 January 23 -  Snow Plow Mailbox Hockey Day
 January 25 -  A Room of One’s Own Day
 January 30 -  National Inane Answering Message Day
 February 5 -  Move Hollywood & Broadway to Lebanon, Pennsylvania Day
 February 7 -  Wave All Your Fingers At Your Neighbors Day
 February 11 -  Satisfied Staying Single Day
 February 13 -  Get a Different Name Day
 February 17 -  Who Shall I Be Day?
 February 20 -  Northern Hemisphere Hoodie-Hoo-Day
 February 22 -  For the Love of Mike Day
 February 23 -  Curling is Cool Day
 February 26 -  For Pete's Sake Day
 March 3 -  What if Cats & Dogs Had Opposable Thumbs Day
 March 9 -  Panic Day
 March 15 -  National Brutus Day
 March 15 -  True Confessions Day
 March 16 -  Lips Appreciation Day
 March 18  -  Forgive Mom and Dad Day
 March 22 -  As Young As You Feel Day
 March 26 -  Make Up Your Own Holiday Day
 March 27 - Quirky Country Music Song Titles Day
 April 7 - No Housework Day
 April 8 - Trading Cards for Grown-ups Day
 April 12 - Walk on Your Wild Side Day
 April 17 - Blah Blah Blah Day
 April 18 - Pet Owner's Independence Day
 April 26 - Hug an Australian Day
 May 6 - No Homework Day
 May 8 - No Socks Day
 May 11 - Eat What You Want Day
 May 18 - Send an Electronic Greeting Card Day
 May 21 - I Need a Patch for That Day
 May 28 - The Slugs Return From Capistrano Day
 June 2 - Yell "Fudge" at the Cobras in North America Day
 June 14 - Family History Day
 June 22 - Stupid Guy Thing Day
 June 23 - Let It Go Day
 June 24 - Celebration of the Senses
 July 3 - Stay Out of the Sun Day
 July 6 - Take Your Webmaster to Lunch Day
 July 10 - Don't Step on a Bee Day
 July 13 - Embrace Your Geekness Day
 July 13 - Gruntled Workers Day
 July 15 - Be a Dork Day
 July 23 - Hot Enough For Ya Day
 July 27 - Take Your Houseplants for a Walk Day
 August 7 - Particularly Preposterous Packaging Day
 August 8 - Sneak Some Zucchini onto Your Neighbors' Porch Day
 August 18 - Bad Poetry Day
 August 22 - Southern Hemisphere Hoodie-Hoo Day
 August 28 - Race Your Mouse Around the Icons Day
 August 28 - Crackers Over The Keyboard Day
 August 29 - More Herbs, Less Salt Day
 August 31 - Love Litigating Lawyers Day
 September 9 - Wonderful Weirdos Day
 September 11 - Remember Freedom Day
 September 16 - Stay Away From Seattle Day
 September 22 - Dear Diary Day
 September 28 - Fish Tank Floorshow Night
 October 12 - International Moment of Frustration Scream Day
 October 14 - Be Bald and Be Free Day
 October 19 - Evaluate Your Life Day
 October 27 - Cranky Co-Workers Day
 October 30 - Haunted Refrigerator Night
 November 3 - Cliché Day
 November 8 - Cook Something Bold and Pungent Day
 November 18 -  Married To A Scorpio Support Day
 November 19 - Have a Bad Day Day
 November 20 - Name Your PC Day
 November 25 - Blasé Day
 November 30 - Stay Home Because You're Well Day
 December 1 - Bifocals At The Monitor Liberation Day
 December 5 - Bathtub Party Day
 December 13 - Pick A Pathologist Pal Day
 December 15 - Cat Herders' Day
 December 16 - Barbie and Barney Backlash Day
 December 21 - Humbug Day
 December 29 - Tick Tock Day
 December 30  - Falling Needles Family Fest

Personal life
Roy currently resides in Lebanon, Pennsylvania. He has a wife and son.

Filmography

References

External links
 
 Wellcat Holidays from Ruth and Thomas Roy

1940s births
Living people
Male actors from Pennsylvania
American male film actors
American male radio actors
American male stage actors
American male television actors
American male voice actors
People from Lancaster County, Pennsylvania
People from Lebanon, Pennsylvania
Place of birth missing (living people)